William Addison Phillips -- 

(Also known as Col. William Addison Phillips, Sr ; or Wm A. Phillips, W.A. Phillips)

[January 14, 1824 – November 30, 1893] 

Wm A. Phillips ws a Free-State Abolition Journalist during the tumultuous epoch in 19th century United States history known as "Bleeding Kansas",  as well as a brave & decorated Veteran of the American Civil War; ending with the commission of Colonel           (Kansas Militia, Union Army/Cavalry, Company B,    1st & 3rd Indian Home Guard) although his merital nominations of promotion were prejudicly overcast by political views askewed from those of his own, thus subceeding Col. Phillips' efforts in advance of becoming not only a Brigadier General, but a Major General of which he certainly would've been afforded if not for outside inferences. Also, a Republican party based Kansas U.S. Representative in Congress.

Biography
Born in Paisley, Scotland, Phillips attended the common schools of Paisley.
He immigrated to the United States in 1838 with his parents, who settled in Randolph County, Illinois.
He engaged in agricultural pursuits.
He was employed as a newspaper correspondent 1845–1862.
He studied law.
He was admitted to the bar in 1855 and commenced practice in Lawrence, Kansas, working also as a correspondent for the New York Tribune.
He was first justice of the Kansas Supreme Court under the Leavenworth Constitution.
In 1858, he settled and founded the city of Salina, Kansas with a wagon circle against constant threat by hostile tribes.
During the American Civil War, though offered a large sum to be a correspondent at the front, he entered the Union Army as a volunteer, and raised some of the first troops in Kansas in 1861.
He was a major in the 1st Indian Home Guard. He was promoted to colonel and served as commander of the Cherokee Indian Regiment in the 3rd Indian Home Guard.
He served as prosecuting attorney of Cherokee County in 1865.
He served in the state House of Representatives in 1865.

He was elected as a Republican to the Forty-third, Forty-fourth, and Forty-fifth Congresses (March 4, 1873 – March 3, 1879).
He was an unsuccessful candidate for renomination in 1878.
After leaving Congress, he was attorney for the Cherokee Indians at Washington, D.C.
He was an unsuccessful candidate for election to Congress in 1890.
He died at Fort Gibson, Muskogee County, Indian Territory (now Oklahoma), November 30, 1893.
He was interred in Gypsum Hill Cemetery, Salina, Kansas.

The city of Phillipsburg, Kansas was named in honor William A. Phillips.

References

Bibliography

 Kansas cyclopedia

External links
 

1824 births
1893 deaths
Scottish emigrants to the United States
Republican Party members of the Kansas House of Representatives
Politicians from Salina, Kansas
People from Paisley, Renfrewshire
People of Kansas in the American Civil War
Union Army colonels
Republican Party members of the United States House of Representatives from Kansas
19th-century American politicians
American city founders